Fa'asui Fuatai (born 1 August 1993) is a New Zealand rugby union player currently playing for Rugby New York (Ironworkers) in  Major League Rugby (MLR). His preferred position is centre or wing.

Professional career
Fuatai signed for Major League Rugby side Rugby United New York ahead of the 2021 Major League Rugby season. He also played for French side Bordeaux Bègles. Fuatai played for the New Zealand Sevens team at two competitions in 2017.

Personal life
Fuatai is in a relationship with Gina Crampton, the New Zealand netball international.

References

External links
itsrugby.co.uk Profile

1993 births
Living people
New Zealand rugby union players
Rugby union centres
Rugby union wings
Otago rugby union players
Union Bordeaux Bègles players
Bay of Plenty rugby union players
Rugby New York players
New Zealand expatriate sportspeople in France
New Zealand expatriate sportspeople in the United States
Expatriate rugby union players in the United States
Expatriate rugby union players in France
New Zealand expatriate rugby union players